The 1936 Connecticut gubernatorial election was held on November 3, 1936. Incumbent Democrat Wilbur Lucius Cross defeated Republican nominee Arthur M. Brown with 55.29% of the vote.

General election

Candidates
Major party candidates
Wilbur Lucius Cross, Democratic
Arthur M. Brown, Republican

Other candidates
Jasper McLevy, Socialist
Joseph Mackay, Socialist Labor
Isadore Wofsy, Communist

Results

References

1936
Connecticut
Gubernatorial